0181 is a compilation album by Four Tet, released by Text Records in January 2013. Comprising non-album tracks that were recorded between 1997 and 2001, Kieran Hebden announced the release of the album on the morning of its release via his Twitter and Facebook pages.

0181's name is a pre-2000 area code for London, where Hebden grew up.

Track listing

See also
871

References

Four Tet albums
2013 compilation albums
Text Records albums
Albums produced by Kieran Hebden